Cooper Creek Reservoir is a body of water behind an earthen dam across Cooper Creek in the Umpqua River basin of the U.S. state of Oregon. The impoundment provides part of Sutherlin's drinking water.

The reservoir supports populations of largemouth bass, panfish, and stocked rainbow trout.  The panfish and bass grow to large sizes, but mercury pollution from old mine tailings upstream makes eating them risky. On February 12, 2001 Oregon Health Department issued a mercury-related health advisory for fish caught in the reservoir. However, municipal water from the reservoir was deemed safe to drink, and the mercury posed no threat to recreational activities in the lake.  Mercury levels in the fish were not expected to diminish in the foreseeable future.

Recreation
Cooper Creek Reservoir Park, managed by Douglas County, has two boat launches, a swimming area, and a dock. It offers opportunities for fishing, waterskiing, and jet skiing. Amenities include a pavilion, a picnic area, and toilets. The park is for day use only, and no camping is allowed. A hiking trail circles the reservoir.

See also
 List of lakes in Oregon

References

Rivers of Douglas County, Oregon
Reservoirs in Oregon